South Tyrone may refer to:

The southern part of County Tyrone
South Tyrone (Northern Ireland Parliament constituency)
South Tyrone (UK Parliament constituency)